Maksim Valerevich Zyuzyakin (Russian: Максим Валерьевич Зюзякин) (born 13 January 1991) is a Russian professional ice hockey player who is currently under contract to HC Khimik Voskresensk in the Supreme Hockey League (VHL). He has played for various KHL, Supreme Hockey League (VHL), and Junior Hockey League (MHL) teams.

Zyuzyakin was the only rostered member of the team not aboard the 2011 Lokomotiv Yaroslavl plane crash. He had been asked by head coach Brad McCrimmon to stay behind in Yaroslavl to rest and meet with the team in Moscow for their next scheduled game against Spartak, which was never played, as Lokomotiv Yaroslavl cancelled their participation in the 2011–12 KHL season as a result of the crash. Instead Russian hockey coach Petr Vorobiev led the team as it played part of the 2011–2012 season in the VHL, Russia's equivalent of the American Hockey League. As the only surviving player, Zyuzyakin later was named captain of Lokomotiv Yaroslavl for the 2011–12 VHL season and became a symbol of the team's revival.

In the 2013–14 VHL season he went to the playoffs with Rubin Tyumen. He played with Metallurg Novokuznetsk for part of the 2013–14 KHL season.

References

External links

1991 births
Ariada Volzhsk players
Dizel Penza players
HC Lada Togliatti players
Living people
Lokomotiv Yaroslavl players
Metallurg Novokuznetsk players
People from Novokuznetsk
Rubin Tyumen players
Russian ice hockey forwards
HC Sarov players
Saryarka Karagandy players
Sputnik Nizhny Tagil players
Sportspeople from Kemerovo Oblast